The Cabinet of the First Republic of Guinea was the governing body of Guinea from independence on 28 September 1958 until the death of President Ahmed Sékou Touré on 26 March 1984, followed by a bloodless coup by Colonel Lansana Conté on 3 April 1984. For much of that time, the country was run by a tight-knit inner group, many of them relatives of Sékou Touré, who became the primary beneficiaries of the regime.

1957 transitional council

The council during the transition to independence, announced on 9 May 1957, had the following members:

1958 first council

The first council after independence, announced on 10 November 1958, had the following members:

1963 Council
The 1963 council, announced on 1 January 1963, included the following members:

1964 shuffle
On 1 February 1964 some ministers changed jobs:

1964 government

On 8 November 1964 the positions were announced as:

1965 shuffle
There was a minor shuffle on 17 November 1965, with the following assignments:

1968 cabinet

A new cabinet was announced on 19 January 1968:

1962–1969 votes received

The National Political Bureau originally consisted of 17 members elected every three years in congress. 
The members between 31 December 1962 and 17 September 1969, by number of votes obtained, were:
Sekou Touré
Diallo Saüfoulaye
Camara Loffo
Bangoura Mafory
Louis Lansana Beavogui
Ismaël Touré
Moussa Diakité
Keita Nfamara
Lansana Diané
Abdourahmane Diallo
Jean Tounkara Faragué
Mamadou Fofana
Camara Damantang
Mamady Kaba
Camara Bengaly
Leo Maka
Daouda Camara

Further changes occurred in 1969, and following the attempted coup in 1970.

1972 cabinet

In 1972, Mamadi Keïta was leader of the left-wing faction in the Politburo, engaged in a struggle with Ismaël Touré to be recognized as the next in line to succeed the president, Sékou Touré.
At the 9th party congress that year, the right-center took control. 
Sékou Touré remained president and Lansana Beavogui was given the newly created title of Prime Minister.
Ismaël Touré gained the powerful position of Minister of the Economy and Finance, while Mamadi Keïta was relegated to Minister of Culture and Education. His brother Seydou Keïta became ambassador to Western Europe.

A partial list of cabinet members:

In May 1972, the members of the National Politbureau who welcomed Fidel Castro of Cuba on his visit to Guinea were:
Ahmed Sékou Touré, President
Lansana Beavogui, prime minister
Ismaël Touré, minister of finance and economic affairs
Mamadi Keïta minister of education
Moussa Diakité, minister of the interior and security
N'Famara Keïta, minister of social affairs
Lansana Diane permanent secretary of the National Political Bureau

1979 cabinet

The final cabinet reorganization in the first republic was announced on 1 June 1979:

Key cabinet members

Key members, their posts and relationship with the president were:

References

External links

Politics of Guinea
1958 establishments in Guinea